The 2010 Bern Open is a curling tournament that will be held at the Bern Curling Club in Bern, Switzerland from October 22-24, as a part of the World Curling Tour. 32 teams will be playing in a triple-knockout format to qualify for 8 quarterfinal spots.

Teams

Knockout results

A Event

B Event

C Event

Playoffs

External links
2010 Bern Open WCT Site

Bern Open, 2010